The New Dimension programme, sometimes referred to as the New Dimension or New Dimensions, was started by the Department for Communities and Local Government in the UK, for fire and rescue services in England and Wales, following the September 11, 2001 attacks in the United States. It has provided equipment, training and standardised procedures to deal with terrorist attacks and major environmental disasters. By July 2004, the New Dimension programme had provided £56 million to various projects; a further £132 million was promised for the period up to 2007. 

The New Dimension programme operates at a national, regional and local level, and while it does not apply specifically to Scotland, a Fire and Rescue Service circular, published in 2007 noted that: "Officials in the Welsh Assembly Government and the Scottish Executive agree in principle that the general terms of the Mutual Aid Protocol should apply 'cross-border' between Scotland, England (and Wales)." New Dimension provides a co-ordinated approach across the emergency services, and local authority emergency planners and it has been supported and promoted by the Chief Fire Officers Association.

In 2015, the Conservative government announced that a third of the vehicles allocated to the programme were to be withdrawn in 2016.

Programme scope

The New Dimension programme was part of Department for Communities and Local Government's fire resilience programme, which also included the FireLink and FiReControl projects. 318 New Dimension appliances, 238 of these being prime movers with removeable 'pods' and the remaining 80 being Incident Response Units equipped for decontamination, were supplied by Marshall Specialist Vehicles on MAN TGA chassis. These were equipped with FireLink digital radios on delivery, creating a single wide area communications system across England, Wales and Scotland.

The purpose of New Dimension is to provide information and guidance for fire and rescue services on emergency response to the following specific types of incident:

 Terrorist chemical, biological, radiological and nuclear (CBRN) threats
 Chemical, biological, radiological and nuclear incidents
 Industrial and domestic accidents
 Chemical spills and collapsed buildings
 Natural disasters
 Floods and earthquakes

The onus is on fire services to provide "New Dimension capability", and legislation for England, passed in April 2007, recognised a fire and rescue service's responsibilities for dealing with the above types of incident. The Fire and Rescue Services (Emergencies) (England) Order 2007 is a statutory instrument which requires that fire services make provision for dealing with CBRN incidents and structural collapse. Funding from the New Dimension scheme has been used (as one example) to provide fire services with new specialist Urban Search and Rescue appliances and equipment.  Previously, fire services were not specifically equipped to deal with largescale USAR incidents.

Vehicles part of New Dimension until scrapped in 2016:
Incident Response Unit
Detection, Identification, Monitoring 
Prime Mover to carry pods
Urban Search and Rescue pod
High Volume Pump pod

Operational use
New Dimension appliances have been used in a number of roles since the scheme's creation. Notable uses include various floods such as the 2007 United Kingdom floods, the Buncefield fire, the Stockline Plastics factory explosion in Glasgow and the 7 July 2005 London bombings.

References 

Emergency management in the United Kingdom